George Dixon may refer to:

Arts and entertainment
George Washington Dixon (1801?–1861), American singer and newspaper editor
George Dixon (organ designer) (1870–1950), British organ designer
George Dixon (trumpeter) (1909–1994), American trumpeter
George Dixon (The Spinners), member of The Spinners (American R&B group)
George Dixon (television character), titular character of the television series Dixon of Dock Green

Sports
George Dixon (boxer) (1870–1908), Canadian boxer
George Dixon (baseball) (1896–1940), American Negro leagues catcher
George Dixon (rugby union) (1901–1991), American rugby player
George Dixon (Canadian football) (1933–1990), Canadian Football League (CFL) Hall of Fame player
George Dixon (rugby league), English rugby league footballer

Others
George Dixon (Cockfield Canal) (1731–1785), English engineer
George Dixon (Royal Navy officer) (1748–1795), English sea captain and explorer
George Dixon (MP) (1820–1898), MP for Birmingham 1867–1876 and Edgbaston 1885–1898
George E. Dixon (1837–1864), American commander of the Confederate submarine H. L. Hunley
George Hall Dixon (1920–2013), American banker

See also
George Dickson
Alexander George Dickson (1834–1889), Conservative MP